Bytyqi is a surname. Notable people with the surname include:

 Arbër Bytyqi (born 2003), Kosovo Albanian professional footballer
 Bardhec Bytyqi (born 1997), Albanian professional footballer
 Enis Bytyqi (born 1997), Kosovo Albanian professional footballer
 Fabiana Bytyqi (born 1995), Czech professional boxer of Kosovan descent
 Hysen Bytyqi (born 1968), Kosovo agricultural scientist 

 Sinan Bytyqi (born 1995), retired Kosovo Albanian professional footballer
 Zymer Bytyqi (born 1996), Kosovan footballer

Albanian-language surnames
Ethnonymic surnames